Overly Dedicated (sometimes stylized as O(verly) D(edicated) and shortened as OD) is the fourth solo mixtape by American rapper Kendrick Lamar, released on September 14, 2010, via Top Dawg Entertainment. The album features guest appearances from Dash Snow, Jhené Aiko, Schoolboy Q, Ab-Soul, Ash Riser, Dom Kennedy and Murs, among others. The album's production was handled by several TDE in-house producers, including King Blue, Sounwave, Tae Beast and Willie B; other producers such as Tommy Black, Jairus "J-Mo" Mozee, and Wyldfyer, also contributed production. The mixtape had sold a total of 12,000 copies as of October 2012.

Background 
On September 4, 2010, Lamar unveiled the cover art for Overly Dedicated, which was designed by ASTHTC. On September 14, 2010, the music video for "P&P 1.5", a song taken from the Kendrick Lamar EP, featuring his Black Hippy cohort Ab-Soul, was released. On September 14, Lamar also released Overly Dedicated to digital retailers under Top Dawg Entertainment, the label that signed Lamar after he released his first mixtape, when he was 17. On September 23, it was released for free download online.

Overly Dedicated includes a song titled "Ignorance Is Bliss", in which Lamar glorifies gangsta rap and street crime, but ends each verse with "ignorance is bliss," giving the message "we know not what we do." It was this song specifically that made fellow West Coast rapper and legendary hip hop producer Dr. Dre want to work with Lamar, after watching the song's music video on YouTube. This led to Lamar working with Dr. Dre and Snoop Dogg on Dre's Detox album and him considering signing to Dre's label, Aftermath Entertainment. On the topic of the project's genre, Lamar called it "human music."

Critical reception 

Writing for Vice, Robert Christgau gave Overly Dedicated an "A−" and found it to be as good as Lamar's first official album Section.80 (2011): "Only three classics: the besotted "Alien Girl," the merely sexed-up "P&P 1.5," and "Average Joe," a position paper for the gangsta realism to follow. But the many cameos document a party-crashing crew utterly delighted by how good they are at this shit. There’s a sense of fun and antic possibility here Lamar abjured on his road to iconicity. In pop music, that’s a spiritual resource there’s never enough of." Mikey McCray of Creative Loafing wrote: "Compton, Calif. emcee takes his place among the best of the new West," however also wrote: "A couple tracks felt out of place. 'Michael Jordan' had a Weezy flow and Jeezy beat but the weak chorus was far from a MJ fadeaway. Don't know who was imitating Bilal on the 'ROTC (Interlude)' but they killed an otherwise stellar track with a cover fail of Common's 'The Light.'"

Track listing

Charts

References 

2010 mixtape albums
Kendrick Lamar albums
Top Dawg Entertainment albums
Concept albums
Albums produced by Sounwave
Albums produced by Tae Beast
Albums produced by Dave Free
Albums produced by Willie B
Albums free for download by copyright owner